Ignatius Phakoe (born 9 July 1927 in Koro-Koro – 23 July 1989) was a Mosotho clergyman and bishop for the Roman Catholic Diocese of Leribe. He became ordained in 1952. He was appointed bishop in 1961. He died on 23 July 1989, at the age of 62.

References

Lesotho Roman Catholic bishops
1927 births
1989 deaths
People from Leribe District
20th-century Roman Catholic bishops in Africa
Roman Catholic bishops of Leribe